Willenhall Stafford Street railway station was a station built by the Wolverhampton and Walsall Railway in 1872, and was operated by the Midland Railway from 1876 onwards. It served the town of Willenhall, and was located to the north of the town centre.  It was originally named Willenhall Market Place.

It was one of two railway stations in the town - the other being Willenhall Bilston Street.

The station closed in 1931.

Station site today

All railway-related bridges, overbridges and small relics remain in situ between Wednesfield and to the north of Willenhall Stafford Street and are now used by motors and pedestrians but the trackbed to the north towards Short Heath where the former over bridge carried onto an embankment is fenced off and heavily overgrown and is still visible on Stringes Lane .

References

Disused railway stations in Walsall
Railway stations in Great Britain opened in 1872
Railway stations in Great Britain closed in 1931
Willenhall
Former Midland Railway stations